Mika Simola (born 24 August 1985) is a Finnish racing cyclist. He finished in third place in the Finnish National Road Race Championships in 2012 and 2013. He rode in the 2016 and 2017 UCI Track Cycling World Championships

References

External links

1985 births
Living people
Finnish male cyclists
Place of birth missing (living people)